Alex Kidd: High Tech World is a side-scrolling action-adventure video game combining adventure, platforming and puzzle-solving elements, released by Sega in 1989 for the Master System, as part of the Alex Kidd series. It is a modified version of the 1987 Japanese Master System game , which was based on a manga series of the same name.

Alterations made to the English version included altered sprites, English text and a different storyline. Because the game was not conceived as an Alex Kidd game in Japan, these alterations caused inconsistencies for the Alex Kidd storyline in the West, such as an appearance of Alex's father in the very beginning of the game, even though his father was missing in Alex Kidd in Miracle World, until being found at the end of Alex Kidd in the Enchanted Castle. Furthermore, while a large variety of characters exist in the game, none of the previously-established characters in the Alex Kidd-universe are anywhere to be found, nor do any of the characters in this game appear in any of the others in the series.

Alex also has a brother by the name of James in High-Tech World who is never mentioned in any other games in the series.

Plot
Alex Kidd is contacted by one of his friends, who tells him a new arcade, High Tech World, has opened in town. Alex has a map to its location, but it has been torn into eight pieces and is needed to find the arcade before it closes at 5:00 sharp. He solves puzzles, answers questions, runs errands and does housework to find the pieces. However, once he finds the pieces of the map, he learns that the front gates are shut, and thus is unable to leave. Using a hang-glider to leave the house he lands in the forest. On his way to the arcade, a clan of ninjas appear, who attempt to attack him. Upon fighting through the forest of ninjas, Alex finally makes it to the Arcade.

Gameplay
The object of the game is to get through four stages. Half the stages contain puzzles to progress and people to talk to, while the other two are linear levels with enemies along the way. There are a variety of ways to fail in the puzzle stages when Alex has some sort of accident or does something he should not.

Reception

The game received mixed reviews. Computer and Video Games said the fun "graphics, sound and gameplay conspire together to make an addictive game" but it was not "quite as good as" Miracle World. Four reviewers of Electronic Gaming Monthly gave the game an overall score of 26 out of 40. Mean Machines Sega rated the game 76%, praising the good graphics and sound, while stating that it did not offer anything better than the original. Defunct Games rated it "F", describing the gameplay as "busywork" and akin to "a bunch of school tests".

References

External links

1987 video games
Alex Kidd games
Action-adventure games
Adventure games
Platform games
Master System games
Master System-only games
Video games about video games
Video games based on anime and manga
Video games developed in Japan